Chiso Co., Ltd. is a traditional Japanese textile producer, one of the oldest yūzen coloring companies in Nishijin district of Kyoto founded in 1555. It produces many styles of kimono and the customers include the royal family members Empress Michiko, Princess Akishino, etc.

The company created the Chiso Gallery containing the collection of about 20,000 items of historic fabrics, books, paintings, etc.

See also 
List of oldest companies

References 

Article contains translated text from 千總 on the Japanese Wikipedia retrieved on 20 March 2017.

External links 
Homepage

Manufacturing companies based in Kyoto
Textile companies of Japan
Companies established in the 16th century
1555 establishments in Japan